Sarkozy (variants include: Sárközy, Sárközi, Sarközy, Sarközi, Sarkozi) is a Hungarian surname. It is a toponymic surname, and means "from ". Notable people with the surname include:

Nicolas Sarkozy (born 1955), French politician, president of France 2007–2012
Cécilia Attias (born 1957), formerly known as Cécilia Sarkozy, ex-wife of Nicolas Sarkozy
Carla Bruni-Sarkozy (born 1967), formerly known as Carla Bruni, third and current wife of Nicolas Sarkozy
Jean Sarkozy (born 1986), French politician, second son of Nicolas Sarkozy and Marie-Dominique Culioli
Guillaume Sarkozy, the older brother of Nicolas Sarkozy
Olivier Sarkozy, French businessman, half-brother of Nicolas Sarkozy
András Sárközy, Hungarian mathematician
Gábor N. Sárközy, Hungarian-American mathematician
Gabor Sarkøzy (also Sárközy Gábor) (1945–2008), Hungarian-Norwegian (porn) actor and director
Gergely Sárközy (born 1941), Hungarian musician
György Sárközi (1899–1945), Hungarian translator and writer
István Sárközi (1947–1992), Hungarian footballer
István Sárközy (1920–2002), Hungarian composer
Lajos Sárközi (born 1967), Hungarian hurdler
Rudolf Sarközi (born 1944), Austrian Porajmos survivor
Anton Hans Sarközi as Tony Wegas (born 1965), Austrian singer and television actor.

Hungarian-language surnames
Toponymic surnames